Wall to Wall is the second album by American singing duo René & Angela, released on August 10, 1981 by Capitol Records.

Track listing
All tracks composed by René Moore and Angela Winbush; except where indicated
"Wall to Wall" – 5:23
"Good Friends" – 3:23
"Secret Rendezvous" – 4:10
"Wanna Be Close to You" – 6:02
"I Love You More" – 5:30
"Love's Alright" – 3:40
"Imaginary Playmates" – (René Moore, Angela Winbush, Chainey) 4:30
"Come My Way" – 4:46

Personnel
Angela Winbush – Lead & Backing Vocal, Keyboards, Synthesizers
René Moore – Synthesizer, Bass (Synthesizer), Lead & Backing Vocals
David Wolinski, Ian Underwood – Keyboards
Gregory Moore, Michael McGloiry, Tony Maiden – Guitars
Louis Johnson, Bobby Watson, James Jamerson – Bass
Andre Fischer, Jeff Porcaro, John Robinson, Ollie Brown – Drums
Bill Reichenbach, Chuck Findley, Jerry Hey, Larry Williams – Horns

Charts

References

External links
René & Angela-Wall To Wall at Discogs

1981 albums
Capitol Records albums
René & Angela albums